Frederick Martin CBE (23 October 1882 – 18 January 1950) was a Scottish Liberal, later Labour politician and journalist.

Family and education
Martin was born in Peterhead in Aberdeenshire, the third son of William Martin and Agnes Clark. He was educated at Peterhead Academy. He married Flora Rennie and they had two daughters.

Early career
Martin became a journalist, working on the Aberdeen Free Press and Morning Post. In 1914 he joined the 5th Battalion, the Gordon Highlanders and was commissioned as a Second Lieutenant. He served until 1915 but became blind during his period of training and was hospitalised in St Dunstans Hostel for Blinded Soldiers and Sailors.

Liberal politics
Martin was elected Liberal Member of Parliament for East Aberdeenshire at the 1922 general election. 

It was rare for anyone with a disability to get elected to Parliament but his blindness during war service brought him a great deal of personal sympathy. He held the seat at the 1923 general election 

but was defeated in 1924 when he faced a three-cornered contest. 

He tried unsuccessfully to re-enter Parliament as Liberal candidate for Central Aberdeenshire at the 1929 general election.

Labour
After the 1929 general election, Martin defected from the Liberals to Labour, succumbing to a feeling that this was the end of the line for the old Liberal party. Despite the party having fought a spirited and radical campaign under the leadership of David Lloyd George it had failed to break back into power. According to one historian, Martin was one of a number of MPs, former MPs and candidates who could no longer imagine the circumstances in which the party could ever succeed again. He stood for Parliament, now in the Labour interest, contesting East Aberdeenshire at the general elections of 1931 

and 1935.

He remained as Labour Prospective Parliamentary Candidate for a general election expected to take place in 1939 or 1940. However, by the time the next election came in 1945, he had been replaced as candidate.

Local government
However Martin did achieve political success at local government level. He served as vice-chairman of Aberdeenshire Education Authority from 1925 to 1930. In 1929 he was elected a member of Aberdeenshire County Council and was Chairman of the Public Health Committee from 1932 to 1945 and Chairman of the Education Committee, 1946–47. He was Vice-Convener (equivalent to vice-chairman) of the County between 1946 and 1949, when he became Convener. He died in office.

Honours
Martin was awarded the CBE in 1942 and was appointed Deputy Lieutenant of Aberdeenshire in 1949.

Death
Martin died at his home in Mintlaw in Aberdeenshire on 18 January 1950, aged 67.

External links

References

1882 births
1950 deaths
Scottish Liberal Party MPs
Members of the Parliament of the United Kingdom for Scottish constituencies
UK MPs 1922–1923
UK MPs 1923–1924
Labour Party (UK) parliamentary candidates
People from Peterhead
Gordon Highlanders officers
British Army personnel of World War I
British politicians with disabilities
Commanders of the Order of the British Empire